Hamar Ruins is the name of an American football team located in Hamar, Norway that competes in the Norway American Football Federation.

External links
Hamar Ruins Official Website
NoAFF Official Website

American football teams in Norway
Hamar